In database security, a negative database is a database that saves attributes that cannot be associated with a certain entry.

A negative database is a kind of database that contains huge amount of data consisting of simulating data.
When anyone tries to get access to such databases both the actual and the negative data sets will be retrieved even if they steal the entire database. 
For example, instead of storing just the personal details you store personal details that members don't have.

Negative databases can avoid inappropriate queries and inferences. They also support allowable operations.
Under this scenario, it is desirable that the database support only the allowable queries while protecting the privacy of individual records, say from inspection by an insider.

Collection of negative data has been referred to as "negative sousveillance":

References 

Database security